North Triangle Pond is a  shallow pond in the West Plymouth section of Plymouth, Massachusetts, east of the Route 80 terminus off Samoset Street (former U.S. Route 44). The average water depth of the pond is less than one meter. The water quality is impaired due to non-native aquatic plants and nuisance exotic species. North Triangle Pond is also home to the endangered Northern Red-Bellied Cooter.

External links
Environmental Protection Agency
South Shore Coastal Watersheds - Lake Assessments
https://www.mass.gov/files/documents/2016/08/wj/pseudemys-rubriventris.pdf

Ponds of Plymouth, Massachusetts
Ponds of Massachusetts